Noma (also known as necrotizing ulcerative stomatitis, gangrenous stomatitis, or cancrum oris) is a rapidly progressive and often fatal infection of the mouth and face. This disease predominantly affects children between the ages of two and six years old in the least developed countries around the world.

Signs and symptoms

The mucous membranes of the mouth develop ulcers, followed by rapid, painful tissue degeneration and necrosis of the tissues of the bones in the face.

Causes
The underlying causes for this disease are primarily poor sanitation and malnutrition. Although the causative organisms are common in many environments, this disease nearly exclusively affects extremely impoverished and malnourished children in tropical regions.

Noma is often reported as a sequela to acute necrotizing ulcerative gingivitis. Fusobacterium necrophorum and Prevotella intermedia are important bacterial pathogens in this disease process, interacting with one or more other bacterial organisms (such as Treponema denticola, Treponema vincentii, Porphyromonas gingivalis, Tannerella forsythia, Staphylococcus aureus, and certain species of nonhemolytic Streptococcus). Treatment of these organisms can help arrest the infection, but does not restore already-missing or disfigured tissue.

Predisposing factors include:
 malnutrition
 vitamin deficiency (particularly deficiencies of Vitamin A and Vitamin B)
 contaminated drinking water
 immunodeficiency
 poor hygiene, particularly oral
 recent illness (especially acute necrotizing ulcerative gingivitis, measles, malaria, and severe diarrhea)
 living in proximity to livestock

Treatment

The progression of the disease can be halted with the use of antibiotics and improved nutrition; however, its physical effects are permanent and may require oral and maxillofacial surgery or reconstructive plastic surgery to repair. Reconstruction is usually very challenging and should be delayed until full recovery (usually about one year following initial intervention).

Prognosis
Noma is associated with a very high morbidity, and a mortality rate of approximately 90 percent.

Epidemiology
The disease affects mainly children in the poorest countries of Africa, Asia and South America. Most people who acquire this disease are between the ages of two and six years old. The World Health Organization estimates that 500,000 people are affected, and that 140,000 new cases are reported each year.

History
Known in antiquity to such physicians as Hippocrates and Galen, noma was once reported around the world, including Europe and the United States. With improvements in hygiene and nutrition, noma has disappeared from industrialized countries since the 20th century, except during World War II when it was endemic to Auschwitz and Belsen concentration camps. The disease and treatments were studied by Berthold Epstein, a Czech physician and forced-labor prisoner who had recommended the study under Josef Mengele's direction.

Society and culture
Children and other noma survivors in Africa are helped by a few international charitable organizations, such as Facing Africa, a UK registered charity that helps affected Ethiopian, and Swiss charity Winds of Hope. There is one dedicated noma hospital in Nigeria, the Noma Children Hospital Sokoto, staffed by resident and visiting medical teams supported by Médecins Sans Frontières. In other countries, such as Ethiopia, international charities work in collaboration with the local health care system to provide complex reconstructive surgery which can give back facial functions such as eating, speaking and smiling. Teams of volunteer medics coming from abroad are often needed to support the local capacity to address the most severe cases, which can be extremely challenging even for senior maxillofacial surgeons. On 10 June 2010 the work of such volunteer surgeons was featured in a UK BBC Two documentary presented by Ben Fogle, Make Me a New Face: Hope for Africa's Hidden Children.

See also
 Necrotizing fasciitis
 Noma neonatorum

References

Further reading

External links

Gangrene
Bacterial diseases
Health in Africa